Sacramento City Unified School District (SCUSD) is a public school system in Sacramento, California. With 47,900 students in 81 schools, it is the eleventh largest school district in California.

Boundary
The SCUSD serves most of Sacramento south of the American River, portions of La Riviera, Mather, Parkway and Rancho Cordova and all of Fruitridge Pocket, Lemon Hill and Rosemont.

Founding 

Harvey Willson “H.W.” Harkness was elected as the first president of the Sacramento board of education in 1853. In 1854, city commissioners opened Sacramento's first public school, consisting of two grammar schools and a co-ed primary school. In 1856, Sacramento High School, the city's first high school, opened. It was the second oldest American high school west of the Mississippi River until closing in 2003. In 1894, the board of education abolished segregated education.

Development 
In 2012, voters approved two general obligation bonds, Measure Q for $346,000,000 and Measure R for $68,000,000, to improve district facilities.

Schools

Demographics
The Civil Rights Project at Harvard University conducted for TIME magazine named Sacramento “America’s Most Diverse City.” Accordingly, SCUSD’s student population is reflected as 36% Hispanic or Latino, 18.3% Asian; 16.3% African American; and 19% white. About 7% of students are of two or more races. Residents within SCUSD speak more than 40 languages; 38% of students do not speak English at home.

Elementary schools
The following is a list of SCUSD elementary schools:

Abraham Lincoln Elementary School
Bowling Green Charter Chacon Language & Science Academy
Bowling Green Charter McCoy Academy
Bret Harte Elementary School
Caleb Greenwood Elementary School
Camellia Basic Elementary School
Caroline Wenzel Elementary School
Cesar E. Chavez Elementary School (4-6th Grade)
Crocker/Riverside Elementary School
David Lubin Elementary School
Earl Warren Elementary School
Edward Kemble Elementary School
Elder Creek Elementary School
Ethel I. Baker Elementary School
Ethel Phillips Elementary School
Genevieve Didion Elementary School (K-8)
Golden Empire Elementary School
H.W. Harkness Elementary School
Hollywood Park Elementary School
Hubert H. Bancroft Elementary School
Isador Cohen Elementary School
James W. Marshall Elementary School
John Bidwell Elementary School
John Cabrillo Elementary School
John D. Sloat Basic Elementary School
Leataata Floyd Elementary School
Leonardo da Vinci eK-8 School
Mark Twain Elementary School
Martin Luther King Jr. Elementary School 
Matsuyama Elementary School
Nicholas Elementary School
O.W. Erlewine Elementary School
Oak Ridge Elementary School
Pacific Elementary School
Parkway Elementary School
Peter Burnett Elementary School
Phoebe Hearst Elementary School
Pony Express Elementary School
Rosa Parks K-8 School 
Sequoia Elementary School
Susan B. Anthony Elementary School
Sutterville Elementary School
Tahoe Elementary School
Theodore Judah Elementary School
Washington Elementary School
William Land Elementary School
Woodbine Elementary School

Middle schools
The following is a list of SCUSD middle schools:

Albert Einstein Middle School
California Middle School
Fern Bacon Middle School
Genevieve Didion(K-8)
Kit Carson Middle School
Sam Brannan Middle School
School of Engineering and Sciences Middle & High School
Sutter Middle School
Will C. Wood Middle School

High schools
The following is a list of SCUSD high schools:

American Legion High School
Arthur A. Benjamin Health Professions High School
C.K. McClatchy High School
George Washington Carver School of Arts and Science High School
Hiram Johnson High School
John F. Kennedy High School
Luther Burbank High School
The Met Sacramento High School
Rosemont High School
Sacramento Accelerated Academy High School
Sacramento New Technology High School
School of Engineering and Sciences Middle & High School
West Campus High School

Charter schools
The following is a list of SCUSD charter schools:

Aspire Capitol Heights Academy (K-5)
Bowling Green Charter Chacon Language & Science Academy (elementary)
Bowling Green Charter McCoy Academy (elementary)
California Montessori Project - Capitol Campus (K-8)
Capitol Collegiate Academy (K-8)
George Washington Carver School of Arts and Science High School
Language Academy of Sacramento (K-8)
Oak Park PrepMiddle School (7-8)
Sacramento Charter High School
Sacramento New Technology High School
Sol Aureus College Preparatory (K-8)
St. HOPE Public School 7 (PS7)	Middle School (6-8)
St. HOPE Public School 7 (PS7)	Elementary School (K-5)
The Met Sacramento High School
Yav Pem Suab Academy (elementary)

Notable alumni

Anthony Kennedy – U.S. Supreme Court Justice
Dr. Cornel West – renowned political scholar

Sacramento Coalition to Save Public Education

The Sacramento Coalition to Save Public Education was formed by disgruntled parents, educators, and community members to counteract what was perceived as an attack on unionized public schools and the abrogation of the responsibility of the district to fund education for every child.

Background

The Sacramento City Unified School District (SCUSD) Board of Education, led by Superintendent Jim Sweeney, created several charter schools in the district, the most controversial of which is located on the campus of Sacramento High School.

To create a charter school at Sacramento High School, the SCUSD Board made the controversial decision to close Sacramento High School. They then issued a charter to St. Hope, a not-for-profit community development corporation founded by former NBA player Kevin Johnson. St. Hope opened its charter school on September 2, 2003. Some parents, along with the teachers' union, sued the district because it felt the creation of the charter school was not in compliance with California state law. The court found that SCUSD indeed violated the charter school law. A consent decree was entered into by the plaintiffs, St. Hope, and SCUSD. and the settlement required that SCUSD create a public high school for the attendance area served by Sacramento High School.  To date several unsuccessful attempts have been made to establish a replacement program for Sacramento High school.

References

External links

 

1854 establishments in California
School districts established in 1854
School districts in Sacramento County, California
Organizations based in Sacramento, California
Education in Sacramento, California